Adenoacanthoma is malignancy of squamous cells that have differentiated from epithelial cells. It can be present in the endothelium of the uterus, mouth and large intestine.

Cause

Treatment
If the tumor is well-defined, the treatment is often includes a hysterectomy and radiation treatment. Treatment may vary according to how far the tumor has spread.

Prognosis
Prognosis is dependent upon the presence and abundance of glandular cells. Outcomes improve if the tumor is well-defined.

Epidemiology
It is associated with hormone replacement therapy (estrogen). The risk is higher in white women than other ethnicities, incidence, prevalence, age distribution, and sex ratio

References

External links 
 Gynecologic Oncology Group an NIH-Funded research group that runs clinical trials
 CancerNet an NIH database with clinical and scientific information
 PubMed a search engine and database for Medical Literature

Rare cancers
Gynaecological cancer
Gynaecological neoplasia